Frank Gee Patchin (1861–1925) was an American author of children's books. He was born in Wayland, New York. He is known for his Battleship Boys series and his Pony Rider Boys series. Patchin has written over 200 adventure books. Many were published under various pseudonyms including Victor Durham and Jessie Graham Flower. He also wrote for the Edward Stratemeyer Syndicate.

References

External links

American writers of young adult literature
1861 births
1925 deaths
American writers